Gabriel Rotaru  (born 8 January 1971, Luduş) is a Romanian footballer who plays for Liga IV club Mureșul Luduș.

External links
 
 

1971 births
Living people
Romanian footballers
Association football goalkeepers
Liga I players
Liga II players
ASA Târgu Mureș (1962) players
CSM Câmpia Turzii players
FC Steaua București players
FC Bihor Oradea players
CSM Unirea Alba Iulia players
Romanian football managers
CSM Unirea Alba Iulia managers